Jill Mills (born March 2, 1972) is an American world champion powerlifter and world champion strongwoman.

Powerlifting contest results
1995 USMC
1996 Alamo Classic, 165 lb. division - 1st
1997 USPF National Powerlifting Championship, Philadelphia, PA - 1st
1997 USPF Texas State Powerlifting Championship, Austin, Ft Hood, TX - 1st
1998 USPF Texas State Powerlifting Championship, Austin, Ft Hood, TX - 1st
1998 APF Raw State Championships, 181 lb. class - 1st
1998 Alamo Classic, 181 lb. class - 1st
1998 Metroplex Rep contest
1999 USPF Texas State Powerlifting Championship, Austin, Ft Hood, TX - 1st
1999 APF Raw State Powerlifting Championship, Dallas, TX (set 4 new state records) - 1st
1999 IPA Westside Invitational, Cleveland, OH, 181 lb. class - 1st
2001 USPF Texas State Powerlifting Championship, Austin, Ft Hood, TX - 1st
2001 USPF Texas Cup - guest lifter, 181 lb division (set 4 new state records and 1 new national record)
2003 APF Texas State Championship, Austin, TX - 165 lb class and overall best lifter, 4 new state records
2003 APF Nationals, Los Angeles, CA - 181 lb class champion

Strongwoman contest results
1997 Lonestar Strength Festival, Euless TX (injured)
1998 NASS Metroplex Champ, Dallas, TX
2000 York Barbell Champ, York, PA
2001 SW USA NASS Strongwoman Champ
2001 Callander Roundtable Champ (World's Strongest Woman qualifier)
2001 Killin Fair Champ
2001 IFSA World's Strongest Woman champion, Zambia, Africa
2002 Northeast Showdown Pro Strongwoman, Boston - won all events
2002 St. Louis Microbrew festival Pro Strongwoman - won all events
2002 Clash of the Titan, Aberdeen Scotland - 1st overall
2002 IFSA World's Strongest Woman champion, Kuala Lumpur, Malaysia
2004 Strongest Woman Alive champion, Riverside, CA

References

External links
Official Site

| colspan = 3 align = center | World's Strongest Woman 
|- 
| width = 30% align = center | Preceded by:None
| width = 40% align = center | First (2001)
| width = 30% align = center | Succeeded by:Herself
|- 
| width = 30% align = center | Preceded by:Herself 
| width = 40% align = center | First (2002)
| width = 30% align = center | Succeeded by:Herself

1972 births
Female powerlifters
American female bodybuilders
American strength athletes
American powerlifters
Living people
Strongwomen
Sports masseurs
21st-century American women